Sansom Row is a row of historic houses at 3402 to 3436 Sansom Street in the University City neighborhood of Philadelphia, Pennsylvania.

Built in 1869 to 1871, the rowhouses are constructed in matching three-story pairs, with brownstone facades and slate mansard roofs. They are significant as a surviving example of post-Civil War architecture in the area.

Madame Blavatsky, a founder of Theosophy and the Theosophical Society, lived here at 3420 Sansom Street for a time.

The houses were built as residences but most have been converted to other, mainly commercial uses. In the 1970’s it became a popular locale among the Penn community and local residents for its restaurants and shops, like La Terrasse, White Dog Cafe and The Black Cat .

References

External links
National Register Nomination, prepared by George E. Thomas, at the University City Historical Society.
Listing at Philadelphia Architects and Buildings

Neighborhoods in Philadelphia
National Register of Historic Places in Philadelphia
Second Empire architecture in Pennsylvania
Houses completed in 1871
Houses on the National Register of Historic Places in Pennsylvania
Historic districts in Philadelphia
University City, Philadelphia
Houses in Philadelphia
Historic districts on the National Register of Historic Places in Pennsylvania